The Olympus C-150 (also known as D-390) is an entry level digital camera from Olympus. It works as a standard USB storage device, and uses xD-Picture Cards for storage.

References
 C-150 product page

C-150
Cameras introduced in 2003